Shiela Marie Pineda (born January 21, 1991) is a Filipino volleyball athlete.

Career
Pineda played for Adamson Lady Falcons during the UAAP Season 75 being named Best Server and the UAAP Season 76. She then played for Cagayan Valley Lady Rising Suns in the 11th Season Open Conference being named Best Digger and 12th Season Reinforced Open Conference before joining Petron Tri-Activ Spikers.

In the 2017 season of the Philippine SuperLiga, Pineda and teammate Frances Molina of Petron XCS won the bronze medal in the Beach Challenge Cup. Petron Blaze Spikers swept the F2 Logistics Cargo Movers in the All-Filipino Conference finals and won the championship. For the Grand Prix conference, her team placed second against their same opponent in the All-Filipino conference.

Clubs
 Cagayan Valley Lady Rising Suns (2014–2015)
 Kia Forte (2015)
 Petron Blaze Spikers (2016–2017)
 Generika-Ayala Lifesavers (2018)
 United VC (2019)
 Choco Mucho Flying Titans (2019)
 Sta. Lucia Lady Realtors (2020–2021)
 Petro Gazz Angels (2022)
 Akari Chargers (2023 - present)

Awards

Individual
 UAAP Season 75 "Best Server"
 UAAP Season 76 Beach Volleyball "MVP"
 Shakey's V-League 11th Season Open Conference "Best Digger"

Clubs
 Shakey's V-League 10th Season: Open Conference –  Champion, with Cagayan Valley Lady Rising Suns
 Shakey’s V-League 11th Season: 1st Conference –  Third place, with Adamson Lady Falcons
 Shakey's V-League 11th Season: Open Conference –  Runner-Up, with Cagayan Valley Lady Rising Suns
 Shakey’s V-League 11th Season: Reinforced Conference –  Champion, with Cagayan Valley Lady Rising Suns
 2014 PSL Grand Prix Conference –  Champion, with Petron Blaze Spikers
 2015 PSL All-Filipino Conference –  Champion, with Petron Blaze Spikers
 2017 PSL Beach Volleyball Challenge Cup –  Third place, with Petron XCS
 2017 PSL All-Filipino Conference –  Champion, with Petron Blaze Spikers
 2017 Philippine SuperLiga Grand Prix –  Runner-Up, with Petron Blaze Spikers
  Runner-Up, (2022 PVL Open Conference) with (Petro Gazz Angels)
  Champions - (2022 PVL Reinforced Conference) with (Petro Gazz Angels)

References

Filipino women's volleyball players
Living people
Adamson University alumni
University Athletic Association of the Philippines volleyball players
1991 births
Volleyball players from Pampanga
Liberos